Gavlan (also Romanized as Gavlān) is a village in Anzal-e Jonubi Rural District, Anzal District, Urmia County, West Azerbaijan Province, Iran. At the 2006 census, its population was 1,084, in 263 families. The village was largely inhabited by Assyrians until the Assyrian genocide.

References 

Populated places in Urmia County